Mohammed Ahmed (born 4 September 1989) is an Indian cricketer. He made his Twenty20 debut on 8 November 2019, for Railways in the 2019–20 Syed Mushtaq Ali Trophy.

References

External links
 

1989 births
Living people
Indian cricketers
Railways cricketers